Nea Santa (old name Volovot until 1926), is a small town in Kilkis regional unit, in the Central Macedonia region of Greece. It has a population of 1,693 (2011 census). The community Nea Santa (pop. 2,144 in 2011) consists of the villages Nea Santa and Panteleimon. Nea Santa is south of the city of Kilkis in the Kilkis municipality.

The town was re-settled by Greek refugees from the Pontus in the 1920s, and was named after the Santa region of the Pontus (now Dumanlı).

Nea Santa is close to a small industrial area providing home to few companies in the areas of textiles, plastics, processed food and industrial machinery.

The 71st Airmobile Brigade "Pontos" is also located there.

References 

Populated places in Kilkis (regional unit)